Birmingham is a city in Van Buren County, Iowa, United States. The population was 367 at the 2020 census.

History
Birmingham was laid out in 1839. The town was incorporated on May 20, 1856.

Geography 
Birmingham is located at 40°52'43" North, 91°56'48" West (40.878626, -91.946610).

Demographics

2010 census
At the 2010 census there were 448 people, 191 households, and 120 families living in the city. The racial makup of the city was 97.8% White, 0.7% African American, 0.2% from other races, and 1.3% from two or more races. Hispanic or Latino of any race were 2.0%.

Of the 191 households 30.9% had children under the age of 18 living with them, 48.2% were married couples living together, 7.9% had a female householder with no husband present, 6.8% had a male householder with no wife present, and 37.2% were non-families. 29.8% of households were one person and 10.5% were one person aged 65 or older. The average household size was 2.35 and the average family size was 2.86.

The median age was 41 years. 23% of residents were under the age of 18; 7% were between the ages of 18 and 24; 24.3% were from 25 to 44; 27.4% were from 45 to 64; and 18.3% were 65 or older. The gender makeup of the city was 51.6% male and 48.4% female.

2000 census
At the 2000 census there were 423 people, 185 households, and 120 families living in the city. The racial makup of the city was 99.53% White, 0.00% African American, 0.00% Native American, 0.00% Asian, 0.24% Pacific Islander, 0.00% from other races, and 0.24% from two or more races. 0.95%. were Hispanic or Latino of any race.

Of the 185 households 29.2% had children under the age of 18 living with them, 54.6% were married couples living together, 8.1% had a female householder with no husband present, and 35.1% were non-families. 29.7% of households were one person and 17.3% were one person aged 65 or older. The average household size was 2.29 and the average family size was 2.86.

The age distribution was 22.7% under the age of 18, 7.3% from 18 to 24, 29.3% from 25 to 44, 20.3% from 45 to 64, and 20.3% 65 or older. The median age was 40 years. For every 100 females, there were 109.4 males. For every 100 females age 18 and over, there were 103.1 males.

The median household income was $31,406 and the median family income  was $40,250. Males had a median income of $27,614 versus $20,536 for females. The per capita income for the city was $15,554. 8.8% of the population and 3.5% of families were below the poverty line. Out of the total population, 10.1% of those under the age of 18 and 11.0% of those 65 and older were living below the poverty line.

Education
The community is served by the Van Buren County Community School District. It was previously in the Van Buren Community School District, until it merged into Van Buren County CSD on July 1, 2019.

Notable people

Rose Talbot Bullard (1864-1915), doctor and medical professor born in Birmingham
William S. Ervin, Attorney General of Minnesota
Clifford R. Hope (1893–1970) congressman representing Kansas 1927-57

References

External links

The Villages of Van Buren, Iowa Website  Portal style website, Government, Business, Library, Recreation and more

Cities in Iowa
Cities in Van Buren County, Iowa